Najd Tower was a planned 340 metre (1,115 ft) tall, futuristic skyscraper with 82 floors and 496 rooms in Dubai, United Arab Emirates.  Construction began in 2005, then became on-hold.  Later, it was cancelled in 2009. If built, construction would have been completed in 2008.

References

External links
 

Unbuilt buildings and structures in Dubai